"No Lo Trates" (English: "Don't Try It") is an original song by El General, Panamanian artist, ft. Anayka, released in 2001 in the album “Back to the Original.” It has been recently covered by Cuban-American rapper and singer Pitbull, Dominican singer Natti Natasha and Puerto Rican rapper and singer Daddy Yankee. It was released as a single on April 26, 2019, through Pitbull's label Mr. 305 Records, and serves as the lead single from his eleventh studio album Libertad 548.

On January 11, 2020, the song surpassed 100 million streams on Spotify.

Background
The song contains a sample of the chorus of the 1994 song "Rica y Apretadita" by Panamanian rapper El General featuring American singer Anayka.

Promotion
Daddy Yankee shared the single's cover on social media a day before its release, as did Pitbull. Natti teased the fans with the release of photos from the set onto her Instagram stories 

On May 6, 2019, the official music video was uploaded to Pitbull's official YouTube channel, and has gained over 210 million views as of May 2020.

The single was performed live by Pitbull, Daddy Yankee, and Natti Natasha at the 2019 Premios Juventud. The performance was uploaded to Pitbull's YouTube channel, and has gained over 1.5 million views as of May 2020.

Charts

Weekly charts

Year-end charts

Certifications

See also
List of Billboard number-one Latin songs of 2019

References

2019 singles
2019 songs
Daddy Yankee songs
Natti Natasha songs
Pitbull (rapper) songs
Spanish-language songs
Songs written by Jimmy Thörnfeldt
Songs written by Pitbull (rapper)
Songs written by Daddy Yankee
Songs written by Bilal Hajji
Songs written by AJ Junior